The Thaynes Formation is a geologic formation in Montana and Idaho. It preserves fossils dating back to the Triassic period, such as Ammonoidea, Actinopterygii, Actinistia, Conodonta, Gastropoda, Nautiloidea, Ichthyosauria and others. A diverse fauna known as the Paris Biota has been described from the Thaynes Formation.

See also

 List of fossiliferous stratigraphic units in Montana
 Paleontology in Montana
 Paleontology in Idaho

References

 

Triassic geology of Montana
Triassic Idaho
Triassic geology of Utah
Triassic geology of Wyoming